Marvin Van Buren (born 1989) is a Film Director based out of New York. His short film Solace screened at the Cannes Film Festival in 2015. Van Buren's Contents Under Pressure won best feature film at 2019's Hip Hop film festival.

References

https://hiphopfilmfestival.org/employees/marvin-van-buren/
https://cell.vision/magazine/1166
https://www.bet.com/celebrities/news/2019/08/09/hip-hop-film-festival-recap.html
https://filmshortage.com/dailyshortpicks/solace/

1989 births
Living people